The Alice Druhot House is located in southwest Portland, Oregon listed on the National Register of Historic Places.  It is located in the Goose Hollow neighborhood.

See also
 National Register of Historic Places listings in Southwest Portland, Oregon

References

Further reading

1891 establishments in Oregon
Goose Hollow, Portland, Oregon
Houses completed in 1891
Houses on the National Register of Historic Places in Portland, Oregon
Italianate architecture in Oregon
Portland Historic Landmarks